Clear Creek Elementary School District is a public school district in Nevada County, California.

References

External links
 

School districts in Nevada County, California